Year 1031 (MXXXI) was a common year starting on Friday (link will display the full calendar) of the Julian calendar.

Events 
 By place 
 Europe 
 July 20 – King Robert II (the Pious) dies at Melun, after a 35-year reign. He is succeeded by his 23-year-old son, Henry I, who becomes the sole ruler of France. Henry's mother, Queen dowager Constance of Arles, prefers her third son, Robert, as heir to the throne and, with the help of Count Odo II, begins a war against Henry.
 The Caliphate of Córdoba collapses after years of infighting; the caliphate fractures into a number of independent Muslim taifa (kingdoms). The last Umayyad ruler, Caliph Hisham III, tries to consolidate the caliphate, but his raising of taxes (to pay for mosques) leads to heavy opposition and he is imprisoned by his rivals.
 King Mieszko II is forced to escape Poland after an attack of Grand Prince Yaroslav I (the Wise) of Kiev, who installs Mieszko's half-brother Bezprym onto the Polish throne.
 France suffers from a famine (until 1033).

 Middle East 
 The Byzantine general George Maniakes captures Edessa from the Arab Muslims and stabilizes the eastern frontier.

Births 
 March 26 – Malcolm III (Canmore), king of Scotland (d. 1093)
 Hoël II (or Houel), duke of Brittany (approximate date)
 Matilda of Flanders, queen consort of England (d. 1083)
 Muhammad ibn Ammar, Moorish poet and writer (d. 1086)
 Robert, Norman nobleman and Earl of Cornwall (d. 1095)
 Roger I (the Great Count), Norman nobleman (d. 1101) 
 Shen Kuo, Chinese polymath scientist and engineer (d. 1095)
 Spytihněv II, duke of Bohemia (House of Přemyslid) (d. 1061)

Deaths 
 January 1 – William of Volpiano, Italian abbot (b. 962)
 January 5 – Gunnor, duchess consort of Normandy
 April 10 – Liudolf of Lotharingia, German nobleman 
 June 17 – Hyeonjong, king of Goryeo (Korea) (b. 992)
 June 25 – Sheng Zong, emperor of the Liao Dynasty (b. 972)
 June 28 – Taira no Tadatsune, Japanese governor (b. 975)
 July 20 – Robert II (the Pious), king of France (b. 972)
 August 20 – Burchard, French archbishop and count
 September 2 – Emeric, Hungarian prince and co-heir
 September 9 – Gang Gam-chan, Korean general (b. 948)
 November 29 – Al-Qadir, Abbasid caliph of Baghdad (b. 947)
 Aribo, German archbishop and primate (Primas Germaniae)
 Fadl ibn Muhammad, Shaddadid emir of Ganja (Azerbaijan)
 Qadi 'Abd al-Wahhab, Abbasid scholar and jurist (b. 973)
 Snorri Goði, Icelandic Viking warrior and chieftain (b. 963)

References